Titz is a municipality in the district of Düren in the state of North Rhine-Westphalia, Germany.

Since the local government reform of 1975, Titz Municipality consists from 16 districts: Ameln, Bettenhoven, Gevelsdorf, Hasselsweiler, Höllen, Hompesch, Jackerath, Kalrath, Müntz, Mündt, Opherten, Ralshoven, Rödingen, Sevenich, Spiel and Titz.

Museum
 The LVR-Cultural Centre Village Synagogue Rödingen is dedicated to Jewish Life in rural Rhineland of past and present

Notable person
Petra Hammesfahr (b. 1951), bestselling German novelist

References

External links

Düren (district)